The 2007 World Junior Ice Hockey Championships (2007 WJHC) was the 2007 edition of the Ice Hockey World Junior Championship and was held in Mora and Leksand, Sweden between December 26, 2006 and January 5, 2007. The venues were FM Mattsson Arena in Mora, and Ejendals Arena in Leksand.  The total attendance was a significant drop off from the 325,000-plus visitors at the previous World Juniors in British Columbia, Canada.

For 2007, the tournament round-robin format was changed from previous years to resemble more closely the format used in the National Hockey League. Teams would receive three points for a win in regulation, while teams winning in overtime would receive two points.  Teams losing in overtime would receive one point.  During the round-robin portion of the tournament, a five-minute, four-on-four sudden-victory overtime would be played, while the knockout games and the gold medal game would use full-strength, ten- and twenty-minute sudden-victory overtimes, respectively.  If the game remained tied after overtime, an NHL-style shootout (with three skaters instead of five, as per other international competitions) would be held.

Canada won its third consecutive gold medal, capping an undefeated tournament with a 4–2 victory over Russia in the gold medal game. The world championship for Canada was also their first on European ice in a decade; the Canadians had not won a World Junior gold medal in Europe since 1997 in Geneva, Switzerland, when they defeated the United States in the gold medal game.

Canadian goaltender Carey Price was named tournament MVP, garnering a 1.14 goals against average (GAA).

Top Division

Venues

Preliminary round 
All times local (UTC+1).

Group A

Group B

Relegation round

Final round

Bracket

Quarterfinals

Semifinals
Note: Bye Teams will be the home team, but due to Canada being the home team in the first meeting, USA was the home team for their semifinal game.

Fifth place game

Bronze medal game

Final

Statistics

Scoring leaders

GP = Games played; G = Goals; A = Assists; Pts = Points; +/− = Plus-minus; PIM = Penalties In Minutes

Goaltending leaders 
(minimum 40% team's total ice time)

TOI = Time on ice (minutes:seconds); GA = Goals against; GAA = Goals against average; SA = Shots against; Sv% = Save percentage; SO = Shutouts

Awards
Best players selected by the Directorate:
Best Goaltender:  Carey Price
Best Defenceman:  Erik Johnson
Best Forward:  Alexei Cherepanov
MVP:  Carey Price

Media All-Stars:
Goaltender:  Carey Price
Defencemen:  Erik Johnson /  Kris Letang
Forwards:  Alexei Cherepanov /  Jonathan Toews /  Patrick Kane

Final standings

Division I 
The Division I Championships were played on December 11–17, 2006 in Odense, Denmark (Group A) and Torre Pellice, Italy (Group B).

Group A 

All times local

Group B 

All times local

Division II 
The Division II Championships were played on December 11–17, 2006 in Miercurea-Ciuc, Romania (Group A) and on December 10–16, 2006 in Elektrėnai, Lithuania (Group B).

Group A 

All times local

Group B 

All times local

Division III 
The Division III Championship was played on January 8–14, 2007 at the Ankara Ice Palace in Ankara, Turkey.

All times local

See also
2007 in ice hockey
2007 World Junior Ice Hockey Championships rosters

References

External links 
IIHF official website

 
Events in Leksand
Sport in Leksand
Sports competitions in Dalarna County
World Junior Ice Hockey Championships
2007
World Junior Championships
World Junior Ice Hockey Championships
World Junior Ice Hockey Championships
Sport in Mora, Sweden